The canton of Saint-Omer is an administrative division of the Pas-de-Calais department, in northern France. It was created at the French canton reorganisation which came into effect in March 2015. Its seat is in Saint-Omer.

It comprises the following communes: 

Bayenghem-lès-Éperlecques (Baaiengem)
Clairmarais (Klaarmares)
Éperlecques (Sperleke)
Houlle (Holne)
Mentque-Nortbécourt (Menteke-Noordboekhout)
Moringhem (Moringem)
Moulle (Monnie)
Nordausques (Noord-Elseke)
Nort-Leulinghem (Noordleulingem)
Saint-Martin-au-Laërt (Sint-Maartens-Aard)
Saint-Martin-lez-Tatinghem
Saint-Omer (Sint-Omaars)
Salperwick (Salperwijk)
Serques (Zegerke)
Tatinghem (Tatingem)
Tilques (Tilleke)
Tournehem-sur-la-Hem (Doornem)
Zouafques (Zwaveke)

References

Cantons of Pas-de-Calais